The 2016 Motocross des Nations is a motocross race to be held on 24 September and 25 September 2016 in Maggiora, Italy.

Preview 
The Motocross des Nations travels to Italy this year for the first time since 2009 and will visit the Maggiora track for the first time since 1986.

France are the defending champions having won their third title, on home soil in 2015. The French Motorcycle Federation were the first to announce their team for this years event with Romain Febvre, Dylan Ferrandis and Gautier Paulin being chosen to represent their country. A few weeks later, Ferrandis broke his arm at the MXGP of Switzerland. His position in the squad will be taken by reserve Benoit Paturel.

Australia were the next to be announced, with Motorcycling Australia putting up a team of domestic championship based riders.

Team USA put forward a squad that lacked some of their fastest riders. Ryan Dungey ruled himself out because of injury problems and Eli Tomac decided not to compete. As a result of injury, Jeremy Martin also ruled himself out. This left a squad of Cooper Webb, Alex Martin and Jason Anderson.

Entry List 
Start numbers are allocated based on the team finish from the previous year's edition. France are the reigning champions so they start with numbers 1, 2 and 3.

 Thailand withdrew from the event.

Practice 
Practice is run on a class by class basis.

MXGP

MX2 

 During Practice, Team Ireland rider Graeme Irwin and Team Iceland rider Ingvi Bjorn Birgisson were injured. They would take no further part in the event.

Open 

 Team Finland's Kim Savaste picked up an injury during practice. He will take no further part in the event.

Qualifying Races 
The Qualifying races are also run on a class by class basis and are used to decide which nations qualify directly to the main final. 
Each nation will be awarded points that correlate with their riders finishing position in the race, with the top 19 teams going to the Motocross of Nations main races. The remaining nations will go to the two smaller finals where they will have the chance to become the 20th team in the main finals.
Only the best two scores count for each nation, with their third being dropped. Team Ireland and Team Iceland only have two riders remaining, meaning both of their scores will count.
The points allocated for qualifying are not carried over to the finals.

MXGP

References

2016
2016 in motorcycle sport
September 2016 sports events in Europe